Lalthangfala Sailo is an Indian educationist, short story writer, playwright and a former president of the Mizo Academy of Letters. He is a former deputy registrar at the Mizoram campus of the North Eastern Hill University.

Publications
He has written several articles in Mizo language and has published several books including:
 AIDS dona thawnthu tawi, ral hlauhawm chu (Short stories), 
 Zo kalsiam, 
 Liandova te unau leh Sangi ingleng (plays), 
 Ainawn, the preface of which has been written by Laltluangliana Khiangte.

Awards and honors
The Government of India awarded him the fourth highest civilian honour of the Padma Shri, in 2009, for his contributions to Education.

See also 
 North Eastern Hill University
 Mizo literature
 Laltluangliana Khiangte

References

Further reading 
 
 
 

Recipients of the Padma Shri in literature & education
Living people
Writers from Mizoram
Mizo people
Indian male short story writers
Indian male dramatists and playwrights
20th-century Indian educational theorists
North-Eastern Hill University
20th-century Indian dramatists and playwrights
20th-century Indian short story writers
20th-century Indian male writers
1933 births
Recipients of the Sangeet Natak Akademi Award